Johan Heldenbergh (born 9 February 1967) is a Belgian actor, playwright, screenwriter, theatre director and film director. He gained international fame by starring in films, including A Day in a Life (2007), Moscow, Belgium (2008), The Misfortunates (2009), The Broken Circle Breakdown (2012) and The Zookeeper's Wife (2017).

Personal life
For 19 years he lived together with the Flemish actress Joke Devynck in Hofstade in Aalst, Belgium. On 17 September 2013 it became public that both actors separated. They have three children; two are twins.

Filmography

Film 
 Antonia (1995) - Tom
 She Will Be Mine (1998, short)
 Any Way the Wind Blows (2003) - Schoesetters
 Steve + Sky (2004) - Jean Claude
 My Bonnie (2004, short) - Pascal
 Vleugels (2006)
 Ben X (2007) - religion teacher
 Aanrijding in Moscou (Moscow, Belgium) (2008) - Werner
 De helaasheid der dingen (The Misfortunates) (2009) - uncle Breejen
 Badpakje 46 (2010) - Pascal
 Schellebelle 1919 (2011) - scenarist and director.
 Hasta la vista (Come as You Are) (2011)
 The Broken Circle Breakdown (2012) - Didier
 Through the Air (2015) - Renaud
 The Confessions (2016)
 The Zookeeper's Wife (2017)
 Quo Vadis, Aida? (2020) - Colonel Thom Karremans

Television 
 Souvenirs D'Anvers (1994)
 Ons geluk (1995) - René Hox
 Flikken (2000) - Rik
 Recht op Recht (2001) - Joris Aerts
 Liefde & geluk (2001) - Police officer
 Team Spirit - the series II (2005) - Referee
 Gezocht: Man (2005)
 Selected shorts (2005)
 Witse (2006) - Dirk Desmet
 Jes (television series) (2009) - John Gillis
 De Ronde (2011) - Peter Willemyns
 De Ridder (2013) - John Wouters
 Vermist V (2014) -
 The Tunnel: Sabotage (2016) - Robert Fournier

Theatre 
Together with Arne Sierens Heldenbergh forms the initiative Compagnie Cecilia (founded in 2006).

 Massis the musical (2003) (actor)
 Maria Eeuwigdurende Bijstand (2005)
 Trouwfeesten en processen (2006)
 Broeders van liefde (2008)
 The broken circle breakdown featuring the cover-ups of Alabama (2008) (actor together with Mieke Dobbels)
 Vorst/Forest
 De Pijnders
 Duikvlucht (co-actor and coach)
 Giovanni (actor)
 Vallende sterren (actor)

References

External links 

Compagnie Cecilia website

20th-century Flemish male actors
21st-century Flemish male actors
1967 births
Living people
Flemish male television actors
Flemish male film actors
Flemish male stage actors
People from Wilrijk
Belgian screenwriters
Belgian film directors
Belgian theatre directors